= Jin Daebang jeon =

Korean novel

Jin Daebang Jeon (陳大方傳 The Tale of Jin Daebang) is a novel written in the late Joseon dynasty that details the story of Jin Daebang, an undutiful son who eventually comes to mend his ways to become a filial son. Jin Daebang Jeon is notable in that it features an immoral person as its protagonist in order to illuminate the importance of Confucian ethics and morality.

== Authorship ==
The author and exact date of creation are unknown, but it is presumed to have been written sometime during the late Joseon dynasty by a male author.

== Plot ==
During China's Song dynasty, there was a man named Jin Daebang that lived in the Takju province. Jin Daebang was born into an affluent and prosperous household, in his parents’ old age, but did not listen to his parents and became enamored with alcohol and womanizing. When his father died, Jin Daebang roams the country with a vagabond. He later becomes engaged to the daughter of the Yang household, but she was also a wicked woman.

Jin Daebang and his wife drove out his mother and younger sibling from their family home and lived a life of debauchery with his father's inheritance. Unable to bear this sight any longer, his mother goes to Jin Daebang's home, where she finds her daughter-in-law alone. She begs Lady Yang, Jin Daebang's wife, to persuade Jin Daebang to settle down and live a peaceful life. Lady Yang retorts that if Jin Daebang does not even listen to his parents, what makes her think that he will listen to his wife, and angrily tells his mother not to blame her for her son's bad behavior. Weeping, his mother returns home.

When Jin Daebang returns, Lady Yang lies and tells him that while he was gone, his mother visited and threatened to have Lady Yang put to death by dismemberment for committing a crime of morality. Jin Daebang finds his mother and expresses his fury towards her, upon which his mother goes to the district office and informs the county governor of the situation. The county governor, Kim Uibaek, is an exceedingly filial son. He summons Jin Daebang's family and teaches them the error of their ways—admonishing Jin Daebang's mother for failing to properly teach her son, rebuking his younger brother for their lack of brotherly affection, informing Lady Yang of exemplary benevolent wives and the seven valid causes for divorce, and teaching Jin Daebang the ways of filial sons. The entire family realizes their failures and wrongdoings, and the county governor vacates their crimes and forgives them, sending them back home.

Afterwards, the family lives peacefully together and a rumor spreads regarding Jin Daebang's reforms. The emperor hears this rumor and builds a filial son's memorial gate, grants Jin Daebang a government position, and renames their village “Hyojachon” (Village of the Filial Son). Jin Daebang becomes the governor of Gangneung and rules the people justly and effectively. He faithfully supports his mother until her death, and has three sons and one daughter with his wife—all of them happily living a harmonious life. Jin Daebang thereafter lives for a long time until he peacefully passes away.

== Features and Significance ==
Even though Jin Daebang jeon portrays a thematic consciousness regarding the concept of filial duty, it is different from Simcheong jeon (沈淸傳 The Tale of Simcheong), another story of filial children. Whereas Simcheong jeon centers around a protagonist that consistently practices the concept of filial piety and sense of duty throughout the story, Jin Daebang jeon explores this theme through the character's lack. This work was influenced by moral lesson books, but through the scene with the governor—a character who embodies Confucian morals—these Confucian morals are presented in a manner that is easy for readers to understand. The scene with the governor quotes directly from moral lesson books, particularly the twelve stories of filial piety from the Samgang haengsil do (三綱行實圖 Illustrated Guide to the Three Relationships).

Because this work also features a plotline in which an unfair problem is reported to a government office and thereby solved, it is also considered a songsa soseol—a literary genre popular throughout the Joseon dynasty where a civilian or member of the public makes an appeal to a governmental institution. This is because the problem of Jin Daebang mistreating his mother and younger sibling is solved by his mother's entreaty to the governor.

== Texts ==
There are currently 113 extant copies of Jin Daebang jeon: 93 handwritten manuscripts in Korean, 11 woodblock prints in Korean, 8 printed with movable metal type in Korean, and 1 handwritten manuscript in classical Chinese.
